Rubén Uriza Castro (May 27, 1920 – August 30, 1992) was a Mexican show jumping champion, and Olympic champion. He participated at the 1948 Summer Olympics in London where he won a gold medal in Team Jumping as a member of the Mexican winning team. He also received a silver medal in Individual Jumping. Both aboard his horse Harvey. He was born in Huitzuco, Guerrero and died in Mexico City.

References

External links

1920 births
1992 deaths
Sportspeople from Guerrero
Olympic gold medalists for Mexico
Olympic silver medalists for Mexico
Equestrians at the 1948 Summer Olympics
Olympic equestrians of Mexico
Mexican male equestrians
Olympic medalists in equestrian
Medalists at the 1948 Summer Olympics
20th-century Mexican people